Baldwin Kho (born January 29, 1971) is a Filipino visual artist and Humanitarian. He was the founder of Center for Developmental Arts Manila, Inc.(CDAM), KAPAYAPAAN International Children's Art Festival in 2009, he is the International Humanitarian of Peace awardee of Peace Pals International; Goodwill ambassador of Philippine League Against Epilepsy; founding President of the Epilepsy Awareness and Advocacy, Inc. (Philippines) in 2005 and the director for Bahay Tsinoy, Museum of Chinese in the Philippines.

Early life and education
Kho was born on January 29, 1971, in Binondo, Manila, the eldest among the 4 siblings in the family of Ronnie Ching and Lily Kho. He had his early education at Chiang Kai Shek College, and studied Management Information Technology at AMA Computer College, and he went to study at the College of St. Benilde - De La Salle University taking the course Painting under Prof. Religioso. He is an individual with epilepsy.

Career
In the year 1993, he first organized his first Art and Crafts Workshop in Binondo Chinese Parish. He is also an active supporter of the Autism of the Philippines; he became a youth servant leader at the Binondo Chinese Parish when he was a teenager and remained one for more than a decade after. He is the caretaker of the century-old image of Our Lady of the Most Holy Rosary, a cultural heirloom of the Dominican Order of Preachers and ethnic Chinese – Filipino Catholic community in Binondo.

He published his first colouring book for children in the year 2004. He also opened his own studio called the Orange Artspace, which is located in Binondo, Manila.

In 2009, he launched the Art as Therapy for Children campaign. In the same year, he established the Kapayapaan International Children's Art Festival and the Center Developmental Arts Manila, Inc. (CDAM)

In the year 2011, together with 58 CDAM Kids, Kho received the International Peace Award from Peace Pals International. He also the first ethnic Chinese-Filipino individual to receive the 57th Peace Pole from World Peace Prayer Society. 
 
In 2013, he celebrated his 20th anniversary at the Kaisa Heritage Center.

He celebrated his 25th anniversary with a solo art exhibit entitled "What Lies Beneath" at the Kaisa - Angelo King Heritage Center in Intramuros, Manila in 2018.

Center for Development Art Manila, Inc.
Center for Development Art Manila, Inc. (CDAM) was established in 2009. In 2010, CDAM was incorporated recognized by the Security Exchange Commission as an institution promoting peace through children's art. He also launched the Brent Sia Art Awards, the grand prix of the Kapayapaan International Children's Art Festival is a festival gathering art pieces made by children from the Philippines and the world. A project in collaboration with Peace Pals Art Awards of the World Peace Prayer Society that aims to promote world peace through visual art, and also the awarding for Peace that give tribute to Brent Sia, a young artist who fought cancer of the lymph nodes bravely whose during his lifetime is a boy of peace.

One-man show

Awards

Volunteer in action
Kho is one of the Board of Directors of Kaisa Para sa Kaunlaran, a cause-oriented non-government organization that advocates proactive and sustainable participation of the Tsinoy community in local and national development.

References

1971 births
Living people
People from Binondo
Artists from Metro Manila
De La Salle–College of Saint Benilde alumni
Filipino people of Chinese descent